Bradley Jay Butler, Jr. (born September 18, 1983, in Lynchburg, Virginia) is a former American football guard and tackle for the Buffalo Bills of the National Football League. He was drafted by the Bills in the fifth round of the 2006 NFL Draft. He played high school football at E.C. Glass High School and college football at the University of Virginia.

College career
Butler is one of three Cavaliers in school history to start four consecutive bowl games. He started thirty-one consecutive games at right tackle, the longest streak at the University of Virginia since 1998.  As a senior Butler started all eleven games he played.  Butler drew attention in 2005 when he hit Boston College defensive end Mathias Kiwanuka with a chop-block in the back of his knees several seconds after the whistle, in what is referred to as "the cheap shot heard 'round the ACC."  
Butler was suspended for the following game by his own team as a result of the dirty late hit.

Professional career 

Butler started all but two of the 33 career games he played in after being drafted in the fifth round of the 2006 draft. He was limited to just two games in 2009 after sustaining a serious knee injury in Week 2 against Tampa Bay.

Buffalo Bills 
Butler was drafted by the Bills in the fifth round of the 2006 NFL Draft. He played in two games with the Bills in his rookie season. On September 2, 2007, he was named the starting right guard for the Bills.  In 2009, Butler was voted to USA Today's All-Joe Team which honors hardworking and valuable players who are overlooked. He retired from professional football after the 2009 season.

References

External links
Buffalo Bills bio

1983 births
Living people
Sportspeople from Lynchburg, Virginia
American football offensive tackles
American football offensive guards
Virginia Cavaliers football players
Buffalo Bills players
Wharton School of the University of Pennsylvania alumni
Stanford Graduate School of Business alumni
Harvard Business School alumni